The pine tree shilling was a type of coin minted and circulated in the Thirteen Colonies.

The Massachusetts Bay Colony established a mint in Boston in 1652. John Hull was Treasurer and mintmaster; Hull's partner at the "Hull Mint" was Robert Sanderson. Prior to 1652, the Massachusetts financial system was based on bartering and foreign coinage. The scarcity of coin currency was a problem for the growth of the New England economy. On May 27, 1652, the Massachusetts General Court appointed John Hull, a local silversmith, to be Boston's mint master without notifying or seeking permission from the British government.

Coins were issued in denominations of 3 and 6 pence and 1 shilling. The first pieces bore the letters "NE" and the denomination "III", "VI" or "XII". The coins were smaller than the equivalent sterling coins by 22.5%.
Later pieces, struck between 1652 and 1660 or 1662, bore the image of a willow tree, with an oak tree appearing on coins produced between 1660 or 1662 and ca. 1667. However, the most famous design was the final one to be issued, the pine tree type, struck between ca. 1667 and 1682. The coins circulated widely in North America and the Caribbean.

The pine tree shillings nearly all bore the date "1652". This was the date of the Massachusetts Bay Colony legislation sanctioning the production of shillings by the "Hull Mint" operated by John Hull and Robert Sanderson. The date was maintained by the Hull Mint in order to appear to be complying with English law that reserved the right of coin production to the crown, as in 1652, England was a Commonwealth (King Charles I having been beheaded three years previously). The coins were struck by John Hull and Robert Sanderson, two Massachusetts settlers. The image of the pine tree on the later coins is thought to represent the export of tall timber, used among other things for the mainmasts of British ship of war. The implication of respect owed to the colonies as the source of this vital war material would become sharper with the Pine Tree Flag flown during the American Revolution. The mint was closed by the English government in 1682 and the Colony's charter was revoked two years later by Charles II on the advice of colonial administrator Edward Randolph.

References

https://historyexplorer.si.edu/resource/massachusetts-pine-tree-shilling-1652-struck-1667-1674
https://americanhistory.si.edu/collections/search/object/nmah_1082064

Currencies of British Overseas Territories